Xiwei may refer to:

Western Wei (535–557), a dynasty in Northwest China during the Northern and Southern Dynasties period
Xiwei Bridge, bridge across the Dadu River in Taiwan
Xiwei, Jilin (西苇), a town in Yitong Manchu Autonomous County, Jilin, China
Xiwei, Fu'an (溪尾), a town in Fu'an, Fujian, China
Xiwei Township (溪尾乡), a township in Youxi County, Fujian, China